William Bestwick (24 February 1875 – 2 May 1938) was an English cricketer who played for Derbyshire between 1898 and 1926. He was a medium-fast bowler who took over 1,400 wickets for the county, including 10 in one innings. From his wild temperament and reckless behaviour, he was known as a "bad boy" of cricket.

Bestwick was born at Tag Hill, Heanor, Derbyshire. He was the son of a miner and started working at Coppice Pit at the age of 11. He debuted for the Derbyshire team in 1898, as a professional while still working in the mine in winter. He is one of the only two bowlers to have hit ten wickets in a single innings for Derbyshire, a feat he achieved in June 1921, the other being five-time Test cricketer Tommy Mitchell. He was a true tailender batsman, who never averaged above eight with the bat in a single season for Derbyshire and did not once reach twenty in his last two hundred and eighty first-class innings, a run of batting failures equalled only by Eric Hollies between 1939 and 1954. This extreme weakness as a batsman (and also in the field) was probably why Bestwick never managed to gain a single Test cap.

Though Bestwick finished with the second-weakest average of his debut season, he proved himself capable with best bowling figures of an expensive but successful 4–163. While Derbyshire were bottom of the 1899 Championship table, the team were looking for an upturn in fortunes. A season average of six would not initially indicate this, however, thanks to the best single batting performance of his career, an innings of 39 against Surrey, Derbyshire bested Leicestershire and the winless Hampshire in the season's championship table.

Derbyshire played host to a team of South Africans in 1901, as the young Test nation played a series of eleven warm-up matches against English county sides prior to a Test series against the English cricket team. However, a publicity boost such as this only served to panic an ever-spiralling Derbyshire team into once again finishing in bottom place in the table. The following year, 1902, was slightly more encouraging for Derbyshire, as, boosted by the appearance of long-time Warwickshire player Thomas Forrester, after three years out of the game, Derbyshire finished in their highest position since the beginning of Bestwick's career, finishing the season in tenth place. Bestwick bowled very well in a summer when pitches were almost always too wet to suit a bowler of his pace and was probably the second-best fast bowler in county cricket after William Lockwood.

In 1903, Derbyshire finished twelfth, though the following season saw Derbyshire back up to tenth place, and Bestwick with one more ten-wicket match, beating out left-hander John Hulme, who had the best single-innings tally of the team with 8/52, but no ten-wicket haul to speak of, though Arnold Warren was to hit two similar hauls and outscore Bestwick with the bat, courtesy of a brace of half-centuries. Thanks to another South African tour, Derbyshire got full-on experience of an international side during the 1904 season, and Bestwick was to hit an average of under 30 once again, as he and Warren spearheaded the Peakites' bowling attack, as the two players missed just a single game of the eighteen Derbyshire played throughout the season between them.

1905 was very little of a rise before a fall, as Derbyshire handed debuts for fifteen players in first-class cricket, ten of whom played fewer than five first-class matches, as Derbyshire finished with a −64% winning percentage, the third worst of the season.

Bestwick was noted for his unpredictable nature and his alcoholism after his wife left him in 1906, and this adversely affected his cricketing career. In January 1907 after a night's drinking, he killed a man named William Brown in a fight, although the inquest at the pub the next day brought in a verdict of 'justifiable homicide.'

The late 1900s saw more painful times for Derbyshire as Derbyshire finished second bottom of the table. In 1909, Bestwick played in his final County Championship game for nearly ten years. He was sacked and went to South Wales, where he remarried and played for Glamorgan in the Minor Counties Championship in 1914.

In 1919 44-year-old Bestwick was invited to rejoin Derbyshire in a revitalised Derbyshire team, and with Arthur Morton as his minder. The side was led at various times by captains Richard Baggallay, Guy Jackson and John Chapman, the team's three-season captain before the outbreak of the Great War, the eldest of the Hill-Wood brothers, Basil, Derbyshire finished in ninth place.

Bestwick was practically blameless for Derbyshire's bottom-placing season of 1920, after playing just one game for the team. Despite being 45 years old at this time, he was still turning out regular appearances for a team whose appearances further up the table seemed indicative of a change in fortunes, until 1924 saw Derbyshire winless in 24 County Championship games and rooted to the foot of the table.

Beswick's son, Robert Bestwick, later served as a Derbyshire cricketer, father and son playing two games together during the 1922 season. Bestwick, aged fifty, and having outlasted his own son in the first-class game, played seven games in his final season in 1925. He became an umpire and umpired 238 first-class matches, including three Tests in 1929 and 1930, the last of which was played less than a year before he died.

Bestwick died in 1938 in Standard Hill, Nottingham.

References

External links

Billy Bestwick at Cricket Archive

1875 births
1938 deaths
People from Heanor
Derbyshire cricketers
Glamorgan cricketers
English Test cricket umpires
Players cricketers
Cricketers who have taken ten wickets in an innings
English cricketers of 1919 to 1945
English cricketers
Non-international England cricketers
Cricketers from Derbyshire